Sergeant Hiram H. De Lavie (also known as Hiram Adam Delavie or Adam Delavie) (1824 – 1902) was an American soldier who fought in the American Civil War. De Lavie received the country's highest award for bravery during combat, the Medal of Honor, for his action during the Battle of Five Forks in Virginia on 1 April 1865. He was honored with the award on 10 May 1865.

Biography
De Lavie was born in Stark County, Ohio in 1824. He enlisted into the 11th Pennsylvania Infantry. He died in 1902 and his remains are interred at the Saint Peters Cemetery in Pittsburgh, Pennsylvania.

Medal of Honor citation

See also

List of American Civil War Medal of Honor recipients: A–F

References

External links

1824 births
1902 deaths
People of Pennsylvania in the American Civil War
Union Army officers
United States Army Medal of Honor recipients
American Civil War recipients of the Medal of Honor